The Team 'Aero Kickboxing without Step' category involved eight teams representing seven countries from two continents (Europe and North America).  Each team went through five performances (1.5 to 2 minutes each) with the totals added up at the end of the event.  The gold medal winner was Team Hungary who won their second gold in the Aero Kickboxing team events, Team Slovenia claimed silver and Team Croatia II claimed bronze.

Results

See also
List of WAKO Amateur World Championships
List of WAKO Amateur European Championships
List of male kickboxers
List of female kickboxers

References

External links
 WAKO World Association of Kickboxing Organizations Official Site

Kickboxing events at the WAKO World Championships 2007 Coimbra
2007 in kickboxing
Kickboxing in Portugal